Yana Urqu (Quechua yana black, urqu mountain, "black mountain", hispanicized spelling Yana Orjo) is a mountain in the Andes of Peru, about  high. It is situated in the Cusco Region, Quispicanchi Province, Marcapata District. It lies south of Qullpa Qaqa and southeast of a little lake named Mullu P'unqu.

References 

Mountains of Cusco Region
Mountains of Peru